Boston Township is one of the nine townships of Summit County, Ohio, United States, about 15 miles north of Akron and 23 miles south of Cleveland. It is part of the Akron metropolitan area. The 2000 census found 1,664 people in the township, 1,062 of whom lived in the unincorporated portions of the township.

Geography
Located in the northern part of the county, it borders the following townships and municipalities:
Sagamore Hills Township - north
Northfield Center Township - northeast
Boston Heights - northeast, south of Northfield Center Township
Hudson - east
Stow - southeast corner
Cuyahoga Falls - south
Bath Township - southwest
Richfield Township - west
Brecksville - northwest

Two villages are located in Boston Township: most of Boston Heights, in the northeast, and Peninsula, in the center.  Peninsula is still part of the township but Boston Heights is separate. Cuyahoga Falls annexed an area along State Road and Northfield Center has the Brandywine area due to annexation when Northfield Center was part of Northfield Village .

It occupies most of survey Town 4, Range 11 in the Connecticut Western Reserve.

Name
Named by James Stanford after Boston, Massachusetts, it is the only Boston Township statewide.

It has also been coined as "Helltown" due to  involving the town.

History
Boston Township was established in 1811. Boston Township's land has been in the following counties:

Government
The township is governed by a three-member board of trustees, who are elected in November of odd-numbered years to a four-year term beginning on the following January 1. Two are elected in the year after the presidential election and one is elected in the year before it. There is also an elected township fiscal officer, who serves a four-year term beginning on April 1 of the year after the election, which is held in November of the year before the presidential election. Vacancies in the fiscal officership or on the board of trustees are filled by the remaining trustees.

Public services
Boston Township is served by Interstate 271, which has an exit onto State Route 303 at the border with Richfield Township, and by State Route 303, which goes east–west through the middle of the township.  The Ohio Turnpike (Interstate 80) passes through the township without any exits.

Schooling for the township is provided by Woodridge Local School District.

References

Further reading
  Author unknown, (1999-2005). County Formation Maps. Retrieved May 2, 2005.
  * 
  drelocation.com (2000). Welcome to Sagamore Hills, Ohio. Retrieved May 5, 2005.
  Extension Data Center, Dept of HCRD, The Ohio State University  Ohio County Profiles. Retrieved May 4, 2005.
 
  County of Summit (2005). TAX YEAR 2004/COLLECTION YEAR 2005 FULL TAX RATE SUMMARY SHEET. Retrieved June 18, 2005.

External links

County website

Townships in Summit County, Ohio
Townships in Ohio